PMRT may refer to:

 Peak muscle resistance testing
 Paired multiplex reverse transcriptase PCR (PMRT-PCR)
 Pere Marquette Rail-Trail
 Progressive muscle relaxation therapy
 Mobile Psychiatric Emergency Response Team